"Deeper Underground" is a single by British funk and acid jazz band Jamiroquai from the soundtrack to the 1998 film Godzilla. The song was also included as a bonus track on the group's fourth studio album, Synkronized, as well as on the special edition of the group's fifth album, A Funk Odyssey. "Deeper Underground" became a hit in several countries, becoming the group's first and only single to reach number one on the UK Singles Chart, selling over 339,100 copies in the UK as of March 2017.

Music video
Directed by Mike Lipscombe, the music video was used as a promotional tool for the 1998 film Godzilla. Partly shot on location at Grays' State Theatre, it depicts a 3D film theatre in which the movie is being shown. However, as the screen shows Godzilla walking on the ocean floor, one of its feet breaks the screen, causing water to flood into the theatre as if the screen were made of glass and everything behind it were real. The theatre turns into chaos as the audience tries to get out alive, in the midst of which Jay Kay appears and sings and dances on top of the seats. Several other things go through the screen, including a helicopter, cars, and New York taxis. Some stills from the movie are also interspaced between various scenes. At the end of the video, the camera pans out, and it emerges that this entire flood was itself being watched by a different cinema audience on another screen.

During the making of the video, the extras were not informed beforehand about the sudden influx of water near the start of the video, so the terrified reactions as they try to escape are actually genuine.

Another version of the video replaces Godzilla with a man in the movie who smashes an aquarium, causing the theatre to flood. The rest of the video is completely identical.

Track listings

UK CD1
 "Deeper Underground" (radio edit) – 3:33
 "Deeper Underground" (The Metro Mix) – 6:59
 "Deeper Underground" (instrumental) – 4:44

UK CD2
 "Deeper Underground" – 4:44
 "Deeper Underground" (The Ummah Mix) – 5:01
 "Deeper Underground" (S-Man Meets Da Northface Killa Dub) – 9:02

UK cassette single and European CD single
 "Deeper Underground" (radio edit) – 3:33
 "Deeper Underground" (The Metro Mix) – 6:59

Australian and Japanese CD single
 "Deeper Underground" (radio edit)
 "Deeper Underground"
 "Deeper Underground" (The Metro Mix)
 "High Times" (radio edit)

Charts and sales

Weekly charts

Year-end charts

Certifications and sales

|}

Release history

References

1998 singles
1998 songs
Columbia Records singles
Epic Records singles
Jamiroquai songs
Music videos directed by Mike Lipscombe
Number-one singles in Scotland
Songs written by Jason Kay
Songs written by Toby Smith
UK Singles Chart number-one singles
S2 Records singles